Goldenes Posthorn is one of the oldest wine shops in Germany founded in 1498 and located in the historic center of Nuremberg city.

During history it was visited by many famous people including:
Albrecht Dürer
Hans Sachs
Richard Wagner, etc.

See also 
List of oldest companies

References

External links 
Homepage in German
Facebook page
Location on Google Maps

Restaurants in Germany
Tourist attractions in Nuremberg
Companies established in the 15th century
15th-century establishments in the Holy Roman Empire